Gattermann is a German surname. Notable people with the surname include:

Franz Gattermann (born 1955), Austrian cross-country skier
Klaus Gattermann (born 1961), German alpine skier
Ludwig Gattermann (1860–1920), German chemist
Gattermann reaction

German-language surnames